is a Japanese mixed martial artist who competes in the bantamweight division. He has fought in many well-known mixed martial arts organizations as Shooto, DEEP and Bellator.

Mixed martial arts career

Shooto
Nakamura started his career in 2005. Until 2009, he fought only for Shooto and faced opponents like Shooto and Sengoku featherweight champion Hatsu Hioki, and Shooto veteran Hayate Usui.

DEEP
Between 2010 and 2011, Nakamura won five times and lost two times. He obtained a victory over the DEEP bantamweight champion Masakazu Imanari in a non-title bout, and also defeated WEC veteran and former featherweight King of Pancrase Yoshiro Maeda.

In 2011, Nakamura signed with Bellator to compete in the bantamweight tournament.

Bellator MMA
Nakamura made his debut on April 6, 2012 at Bellator 64 in the quarterfinal match of Bellator season six bantamweight tournament against Rodrigo Lima. Nakamura defeated Lima via unanimous decision (29-27, 29-27, 29-27) and advanced to the semifinals.

In the semifinals on May 25, 2012 at Bellator 70, Nakamura faced Luis Nogueira. Nakamura lost via knockout in the third round.

Mixed martial arts record

|-
| Win
| align=center| 16–7–4
| Tomomi Iwama
| Decision (majority)
| DEEP: 65 Impact
| 
| align=center| 3
| align=center| 5:00
| Tokyo, Japan
| 
|-
| Loss
| align=center| 15–7–4
| Yusaku Nakamura
| KO (flying knee)
| Deep: Cage Impact 2013
| 
| align=center| 3
| align=center| 0:53
| Tokyo, Japan
| 
|-
| Loss
| align=center| 15–6–4
| Luis Nogueira
| KO (punches)
| Bellator 70
| 
| align=center| 3
| align=center| 1:58
| New Orleans, Louisiana, United States
| 
|-
| Win
| align=center| 15–5–4
| Rodrigo Lima
| Decision (unanimous)
| Bellator 64
| 
| align=center| 3
| align=center| 5:00
| Windsor, Ontario, Canada
| 
|-
| Win
| align=center| 14–5–4
| Seiji Akao
| Decision (unanimous)
| Deep: 56 Impact
| 
| align=center| 2
| align=center| 5:00
| Tokyo, Japan
| 
|-
| Win
| align=center| 13–5–4
| Yoshiro Maeda
| Decision (majority)
| Deep: Cage Impact 2011 in Tokyo, 2nd Round
| 
| align=center| 3
| align=center| 5:00
| Tokyo, Japan
| 
|-
| Loss
| align=center| 12–5–4
| Takafumi Otsuka
| Decision (unanimous)
| Deep: 54 Impact
| 
| align=center| 3
| align=center| 5:00
| Tokyo, Japan
| 
|-
| Win
| align=center| 12–4–4
| Masakazu Imanari
| Decision (unanimous)
| Deep: 52nd Impact
| 
| align=center| 3
| align=center| 5:00
| Tokyo, Japan
| Non-title bout
|-
| Win
| align=center| 11–4–4
| Tatsumitsu Wada
| Decision (unanimous)
| Deep: 50 Impact
| 
| align=center| 2
| align=center| 5:00
| Tokyo, Japan
| 
|-
| Win
| align=center| 10–4–4
| Tomohiko Hori
| Decision (unanimous)
| Deep: 48 Impact
| 
| align=center| 2
| align=center| 5:00
| Tokyo, Japan
| 
|-
| Loss
| align=center| 9–4–4
| Isao Terada
| TKO (punches)
| Deep: 46 Impact
| 
| align=center| 1
| align=center| 1:11
| Tokyo, Japan
| 
|-
| Win
| align=center| 9–3–4
| Wataru Inatsu
| Submission (armbar)
| Zst 22
| 
| align=center| 1
| align=center| 1:35
| Tokyo, Japan
| 
|-
| Win
| align=center| 8–3–4
| Kim Jong-Man
| Decision (unanimous)
| FMC 1: Korea vs. Japan
| 
| align=center| 3
| align=center| 5:00
| Seoul, South Korea
| 
|-
| Win
| align=center| 7–3–4
| Wataru Miki
| Decision (majority)
| GCM: Cage Force 10
| 
| align=center| 3
| align=center| 5:00
| Tokyo, Japan
| 
|-
| Win
| align=center| 6–3–4
| Hayate Usui
| Decision (unanimous)
| Shooto: Shooto Tradition 5
| 
| align=center| 3
| align=center| 5:00
| Tokyo, Japan
| 
|-
| Draw
| align=center| 5–3–4
| Hatsu Hioki
| Draw
| Shooto: Gig Central 15
| 
| align=center| 3
| align=center| 5:00
| Nagoya, Aichi, Japan
| 
|-
| Win
| align=center| 5–3–3
| Tenkei Oda
| Decision (majority)
| Shooto: Back To Our Roots 8
| 
| align=center| 2
| align=center| 5:00
| Tokyo, Japan
| 
|-
| Win
| align=center| 4–3–3
| Kyotaro Nakao
| Decision (unanimous)
| Shooto: Rookie Tournament 2007 Final
| 
| align=center| 2
| align=center| 5:00
| Tokyo, Japan
| 
|-
| Win
| align=center| 3–3–3
| Yuji Inoue
| Decision (unanimous)
| Shooto: Shooting Disco 3: Everybody Fight Now
| 
| align=center| 2
| align=center| 5:00
| Tokyo, Japan
| 
|-
| Draw
| align=center| 2–3–3
| Shintaro Ishiwatari
| Draw
| Shooto: Shooting Disco 2: The Heat Rises Tonight
| 
| align=center| 2
| align=center| 5:00
| Tokyo, Japan
| 
|-
| Draw
| align=center| 2–3–2
| Keisuke Yamada
| Draw
| Shooto: 11/10 in Korakuen Hall
| 
| align=center| 2
| align=center| 5:00
| Tokyo, Japan
| 
|-
| Loss
| align=center| 2–3–1
| Daisuke Ishizawa
| KO (punches)
| Shooto 2006: 7/21 in Korakuen Hall
| 
| align=center| 2
| align=center| 4:26
| Tokyo, Japan
| 
|-
| Win
| align=center| 2–2–1
| Hirotaka Tomiyama
| Submission (armbar)
| Shooto 2006: 5/28 in Kitazawa Town Hall
| 
| align=center| 2
| align=center| 3:24
| Setagaya, Tokyo, Japan
| 
|-
| Draw
| align=center| 1–2–1
| Sakae Kasuya
| Draw
| Shooto: 3/3 in Kitazawa Town Hall
| 
| align=center| 2
| align=center| 5:00
| Setagaya, Tokyo, Japan
| 
|-
| Win
| align=center| 1–2
| Seigi Fujioka
| Decision (unanimous)
| Shooto: Soulful Fight
| 
| align=center| 2
| align=center| 5:00
| Setagaya, Tokyo, Japan
| 
|-
| Loss
| align=center| 0–2
| Akiyo Nishiura
| KO (punch)
| Shooto: 5/29 in Kitazawa Town Hall
| 
| align=center| 2
| align=center| 3:57
| Setagaya, Tokyo, Japan
| 
|-
| Loss
| align=center| 0–1
| Yutaka Nishioka
| Decision (unanimous)
| Shooto: 2/6 in Kitazawa Town Hall
| 
| align=center| 2
| align=center| 5:00
| Setagaya, Tokyo, Japan
|

References

1981 births
Living people
People from Ōta, Gunma
Japanese male judoka
Japanese male mixed martial artists
Bantamweight mixed martial artists
Mixed martial artists utilizing judo